Thauera aminoaromatica is a Gram-negative, bacterium from the genus of Thauera. The complete genome of Thauera aminoaromatica is sequenced.

References

External links
Type strain of Thauera aminoaromatica at BacDive -  the Bacterial Diversity Metadatabase

Rhodocyclaceae
Bacteria described in 2002